Virgil C. Moore (born December 4, 1933) was a member of the Kentucky State Senate from 1992 to 2004 representing the state’s 5th Senatorial district. In 2003, he ran for the Republican nomination for Governor of Kentucky. He resided in Leitchfield, Kentucky.

Pre politics
Moore was born near Barbourville, Kentucky and grew up in a rural area of Knox County known as Baughman. He graduated from Eastern Kentucky University with a Bachelor of Science degree in mathematics in 1961 and attended the U.S. Army’s Career Officers School in 1961.

Moore Joint Service, Air/Ground Operations School in 1971. Moore would serve in the army for twenty-one years before retiring as a major. After retirement he spent time farming and as president of Quality Wood Preserving, Inc.

Local politics
Moore served as the chairman of the Grayson County Republican party from 1982 to 1990. He also served as a campaign co-chair for Congressional elections in 1984, 1988, and 1990.

State Senate campaigns
Moore was first elected to the state Senate in 1992. He ran unopposed in the primary and defeated former State Auditor Mary Ann Tobin in the general election by over 2,500 votes. The district comprised precincts in Breckinridge, Grayson, Hart, Larue, Meade, and Ohio counties. In 1996 he defeated Joe Hager in the general election by less than a thousand votes after not having a primary challenger. Before the election, the precincts in Larue County were moved to another district. In 2000 he defeated Bill Corum with almost 56 percent of the vote in the general election. In 2004 Moore lost to Carroll Gibson in the Republican primary winning only 36 percent of the vote. By this time the precincts in Ohio county had been removed but precincts in Larue and Hancock counties had been added.

While in the senate he served on the Tobacco Task Force and was chairman of the Transportation Committee.

2003 Gubernatorial race

Moore sought the Republican nomination for governor in 2003. His running mate for Lieutenant Governor was Don Bell of Oldham County. He finished a distant fourth in the primary winning only 1.5 percent of the vote in losing to Ernie Fletcher. Fletcher would go on to win the governorship in the general election.

References

1933 births
Living people
21st-century American politicians
20th-century American politicians
People from Leitchfield, Kentucky
People from Barbourville, Kentucky